Kentucky Route 106 (KY 106) is a  east-west state highway traversing three counties in west-central Kentucky.

Route description

Todd and Logan Counties
The route passes through mainly rural areas of Todd County and has an intersection with KY 171. At Claymour, it has a crossroad intersection that marks the eastern terminus of KY 507, and the western terminus of KY 178. It then goes through the unincorporated community of Sharon Grove, where a roadside market called the "Hwy 106 Market" is located at a crossroad intersection with two local county-maintained roads, Mount Sharon Road and H Gorbel Road.

After passing through Sharon Grove, the highway enters Logan County about a few feet east of the intersection with Crawford Road, and then has intersections with KY 2376 (Green Ridge-Spa Road), and another one with KY 1151 (Epleys-Stuart Church Road), both are secondary routes in Logan County. The highway makes it to Lewisburg, and runs concurrently with US 431. Only a few hundred feet away from that intersection, the highway intersects KY 107. A few hundred more feet after that, KY 106 breaks away from US 431, and follows Stacker Street into downtown Lewisburg. It then goes through rural areas of northern Logan County after it crosses the Mud River.

Butler County
Despite being an even-numbered state highway, KY 106 becomes a north-south oriented roadway upon entry into Butler County. The highway has intersections with KY 1187, and then KY  949 before reaching its end just north of Huntsville at an intersection with KY 70, the major artery connecting nearby Rochester to the Butler County seat, Morgantown.

History 
KY 106 originally began at Allegre when it was first commissioned in 1929. After that point in time, It followed the course of the current KY 171 from the KY 107 junction to where KY 171's current terminus is located. At sometime between 1969 and 1972, KY 106 was rerouted onto Blue and Gray Park Road off KY 181 just northeast of Elkton and it makes a right turn onto its current alignment, with KY 171 being extended to include its current run through Allegre, across KY 181, and ending at this intersection. The original alignment of Kentucky Route 344 followed Blue and Gray Park Road during the 1930s and 1940s. KY 344 originally served the now-defunct Blue and Gray State Park.

Major intersections

See also

References

External links
KY 106 at Kentucky Roads

0106
0106
0106
0106